Australian Curling Federation is the governing body for the sport of curling in Australia.

Presidents
 Hugh Millikin (... – 2015)
 Kim Forge (2015 – )

ACF Officers
(as of January, 2014)

Structure
The national body has eight state member associations:

Championship events
 Australian Men's Curling Championship
 Australian Women's Curling Championship
 Australian Mixed Curling Championship
 Australian Mixed Doubles Curling Championships
 Australian Junior Curling Championships
 Australian Senior Curling Championships
 Australian Wheelchair Curling Championship

References

External links
 

Curling
Curling governing bodies
Curling in Australia